A Primary Agricultural Credit Society (PACS) is a basic unit and smallest co-operative credit institutions in India. It works on the  grassroots level  (gram panchayat and village level).

State-wise number of PACS

References

Agricultural finance in India
Cooperative banks of India
Government-owned banks of India